Domenico Valmagini (1677-1730) was an Italian architect and engineer, active in a Baroque style in the Duchy of Parma and in Lombardy. He was the main court architect for Ranuccio II. Among his works are the monastery and church of the Benedictines in Piacenza, completed in 1681. He also served as an engineer in the control of the water use of the Muzza river in Lombardy in 1722.

References

Architects from Parma
17th-century Italian architects
18th-century Italian architects
Italian Baroque architects
1677 births
1730 deaths
Engineers from Parma